Joseph Schleimer (May 31, 1909 – November 23, 1988) was a Canadian freestyle sport wrestler, born in Gottschee, Austria-Hungary, who competed in the 1936 Summer Olympics. In 1936 he won the bronze medal in the welterweight tournament at the Berlin Olympics. At the 1934 Empire Games he won the gold medal in the freestyle welterweight class. He won the Canadian Wrestling Championships in 1934, 1935 and 1936. 
Joseph Schleimer was the coach for the Canadian Wrestling Team for
-  Pan-American Games Chicago 1959
-  Commonwealth Games Perth Australia 1962
-  World Championships Toledo Ohio 1962
-  Pan-American Games San Paulo Brazil 1963
-  Olympic Games Tokyo Japan 1964

Always active with Canadian Wrestling community he was the Chrairman of the Wrestling Committee AAUC from 1960 to 1964, President of the Ontario amateur Wrestling Federation from 1955 to 1960. He was also the Wrestling Coach for the Broadview YMCA from 1950 to 1971.  He was the Director of the Canadian amateur Wrestling Association for many years

References

External links
 sports-reference.com

1909 births
1988 deaths
Olympic wrestlers of Canada
Wrestlers at the 1936 Summer Olympics
Canadian male sport wrestlers
Olympic bronze medalists for Canada
Wrestlers at the 1934 British Empire Games
Commonwealth Games gold medallists for Canada
Olympic medalists in wrestling
Medalists at the 1936 Summer Olympics
Commonwealth Games medallists in wrestling
20th-century Canadian people
Medallists at the 1934 British Empire Games